The Saint-Alban nuclear power plant is located on the Rhone river, in the Isère department 50 km downstream from Lyon in the communes of Saint-Alban-du-Rhône and Saint-Maurice-l'Exil.

Description
The power station uses water from the Rhone river to cool its two 1,300 MW reactors and employs 670 people..

Type of reactors
The following types of reactors are installed:

Reactor units

.

Seismological risk
According to WENRA, EDF has prepared a plan in case of an earthquake, however other ASN documents from 2002 there may be some anomalies regarding the remote control and which may put into question the correct functioning of certain elements following an earthquake.

2003 heatwave
Following extremely high temperatures in July 2003 average water temperature rose above the limit authorised by the nuclear safety authorities for a period of 4 hours.

Fire risk 

According to the 2007 ASN annual report recommendations were made to the operator to improve the security of the control room.

See also 

 List of nuclear reactors - France

References

External links 
{fr} Saint-Alban Power station website

Nuclear power stations in France
Energy infrastructure completed in 1985
Buildings and structures in Isère
20th-century architecture in France

no:Saint-Laurent kjernekraftverk